Légende (1906) is a work for trumpet and piano, composed by George Enescu for the 1906 trumpet competition (concours) at the Paris Conservatory and premiered in the competition by students from the trumpet class of Professor Merri Franquin, to whom the work is dedicated. The fact that Enescu found it unnecessary to specify "chromatic trumpet" or "trumpet in C" in the work's title (which might have been normal just a few years earlier) may be  seen as a testament to Franquin's influence in adopting of the modern, small trumpet .

A simple listing of the performance indications which follow each other in the score indicates the constantly evolving character of the music: doux, grave, hésitante, pathétique, gracieux, mouvement agité, chantant, vif, furieusement, rêveur .

Sources

Further reading
 Malcolm, Noel. 1990. George Enescu: His Life and Music, with a preface by Sir Yehudi Menuhin. London: Toccata Press. .

External links
International Music Company - a U.S. publisher of Legende.
Sheet Music
Recording by Wolfgang Bauer
Philharmusica Co., a U.S. publisher of new edition Legende. (For both C and B-flat trumpet)

Compositions by George Enescu
Compositions for trumpet
1906 compositions
Compositions in C minor